Natsgvardiya, or Nats-hvardiia, means National Guard in Slavic languages. The term may refer to:

 National Guard of Russia
 National Guard of Ukraine